Colobosauroides carvalhoi is a species of lizard in the family Gymnophthalmidae. The species is native to Northeast Region, Brazil.

Etymology
The specific name, carvalhoi, is in honor of Brazilian herpetologist Antenor Leitão de Carvalho.

Geographic range
C. carvalhoi is found in the Brazilian states of Bahia and Piauí. The distribution of C. carvalhoi is structured within the southern canyons, with a marked reduction in abundance from the base of rock cliffs through the central portion of the valleys.

Habitat
The preferred natural habitat of C. carvalhoi is savanna.

Description

Reproduction
C. carvalhoi is oviparous.

References

Further reading
Recoder, Renato Sousa; Magalhães-Júnior, Arnaldo; Rodrigues, Juliana; Pinto, Hugo Bonfim de Arruda; Rodrigues, Miguel Trefaut; Camacho, Agustín (2018). "Thermal Constraints Explain the Distribution of the Climate Relict Lizard Colobosauroides carvalhoi (Gymnophthalmidae) in the Semiarid Caatinga". South American Journal of Herpetology 13 (3): 248–259.
Soares MA, Caramaschi U (1998). "Espécie nova de Colobosauroides Cunha, Lima-Verde & Lima, 1991 do estado da Bahia, Brasil (Squamata, Sauria, Gymnophthalmidae)". Boletim do Museu Nacional. Zoologia, Nova Série Zoologia, Rio de Janeiro (388): 1–8. (Colobosauroides carvalhoi, new species). (in Portuguese).

Colobosauroides
Reptiles of Brazil
Endemic fauna of Brazil
Reptiles described in 1998
Taxa named by Marcelo Araújo Soares
Taxa named by Ulisses Caramaschi